Bełcz Górny is a village in the administrative district of Gmina Wąsosz, within Góra County, Lower Silesian Voivodeship, in south-western Poland. Prior to 1945 it was in Germany.

It lies approximately 8 km north-west of Wąsosz, 10 km south-east of Góra, and 61 km north-west of the regional capital Wrocław.

References

Villages in Góra County